Peter Saeed Easho Murad (born 1928) is a former international Iraqi football player, who was one of the first players to play in first Iraq national football team, he also played for Al-Minaa, and with the reserve team of English club Manchester United during the 1960s.

Early years
Saeed Easho was the son of an Eastern Orthodox priest, who had settled in the city of Basra in the early 20th century from the heart of the old Ottoman Empire. Saeed excelled at football at his primary school in the district of Al-Ashar and at Thanawiya Al-Basra and was chosen to play for the Basra Select side while in school, taking on British Army sides based in the city during WWII. He had left the country to study but returned to work as a clerk for the Basra Petroleum Company (B.P.C.) and the Al-Minaa Club.

International career
In April 1951, Easho started playing for the first Iraq national football team, He was called by coach Dhia Habib to play in the first international friendly in the history of Iraqi football. On 6 May 1951, Saeed played his first international against Turkey B in Turkey, which ended 7–0 for Turkey B.

Travel and play for Man. United
After the Iraqi team return to Baghdad, Easho and his friend the player Percy Lynsdale left to study abroad, as well as he spent one year with the reserve team of English club Manchester United during the 1960s.

Honours

Club
Iraq FA Cup
 Winner 1948–49 with Sharikat Naft Al-Basra

References

External links
 Iraq – Record International Players – Hassanin Mubarak
  Iraqi national team players database
 History of Iraqi Sports, 1951
Al-Minaa Club: Sailors of south

1928 births
Living people
Iraqi footballers
Association football defenders
Al-Mina'a SC players
Sportspeople from Basra
Iraqi people of Turkish descent
Iraqi Christians
Iraq international footballers
Expatriate footballers in England
Manchester United F.C. players
Assyrian footballers